Fejervarya kawamurai is a species of frog in the family Dicroglossidae. It is endemic to Taiwan, Japan (Ryukyu Islands and Honshu), and China. It belongs to the Fejervarya limnocharis species complex.

Sources

 Djong, Matsui, Kuramoto, Nishioka & Sumida, 2011 : A new species of the Fejervarya limnocharis complex from Japan (Anura, Dicroglossidae). Zoological Science,  (original text).
http://research.amnh.org/vz/herpetology/amphibia/Amphibia/Anura/Dicroglossidae/Dicroglossinae/Fejervarya/Fejervarya-kawamurai

Fejervarya
Amphibians of Taiwan
Amphibians of Japan
Amphibians described in 2011